Myochrous is a genus of leaf beetles in the subfamily Eumolpinae. It is known from North, Central and South America. There are over 50 described species in Myochrous.

The southern corn leaf beetle (Myochrous denticollis) is a crop pest, and has been reported to damage corn in Illinois. Additionally, the species Myochrous melancholicus has been reported to damage banana fruit.

According to BugGuide and ITIS, the genus is now placed in the tribe Eumolpini instead of Adoxini.

Species

 Myochrous adisi Medvedev, 2004
 Myochrous armatus Baly, 1865 (cane leaf or bud beetle)
 Myochrous austrinus Blake, 1950
 Myochrous barbadensis Blake, 1947
 Myochrous barbadensis barbadensis Blake, 1947
 Myochrous barbadensis coenus Blake, 1950
 Myochrous blakeae Shute, 1974
 Myochrous bolivianus Blake, 1950
 Myochrous brunneus Blake, 1950
 Myochrous bryanti Blake, 1950
 Myochrous calcariferus Blake, 1950
 Myochrous carinatus Jacoby, 1891
 Myochrous chacoensis Blake, 1950
 Myochrous crassimarginatus Blake, 1950
 Myochrous cubensis Blake, 1947
 Myochrous curculionoides Lefèvre, 1897
 Myochrous cyphus Blake, 1950
 Myochrous darlingtoni Blake, 1950
 Myochrous denticollis (Say, 1824) (southern corn leaf beetle)
 Myochrous dubius (Fabricius, 1801)
 Myochrous elachius Blake, 1950
 Myochrous explanatus Baly, 1865
 Myochrous femoralis Jacoby, 1882
 Myochrous figueroae Brèthes, 1923
 Myochrous floridanus Schaeffer, 1933
 Myochrous floridanus floridanus Schaeffer, 1933
 Myochrous floridanus texanus Blake, 1950
 Myochrous geminus Blake, 1950
 Myochrous hispaniolae Blake, 1947
 Myochrous immundus Erichson, 1847
 Myochrous intermedius Blake, 1950
 Myochrous jamaicensis Blake, 1947
 Myochrous latisetiger Blake, 1950
 Myochrous leucurus Blake, 1950
 Myochrous longipes Blake, 1950
 Myochrous longulus LeConte, 1858
 Myochrous magnus Schaeffer, 1904
 Myochrous mamorensis Blake, 1950
 Myochrous melancholicus Jacoby, 1882
 Myochrous monrosi Blake, 1950
 Myochrous movallus Johnson, 1931
 Myochrous nanus Blake, 1950
 Myochrous normalis Blake, 1950
 Myochrous paulus Blake, 1950
 Myochrous pauxillus Schaeffer, 1933
 Myochrous platylonchus Blake, 1950
 Myochrous portoricensis Blake, 1947
 Myochrous ranella Blake, 1950
 Myochrous rhabdotus Blake, 1950
 Myochrous sallei Baly, 1865
 Myochrous sapucayensis Blake, 1950
 Myochrous severini Blake, 1950
 Myochrous spinipes Blake, 1950
 Myochrous squamosus LeConte, 1859
 Myochrous stenomorphus Blake, 1950
 Myochrous tibialis Jacoby, 1882
 Myochrous whitei Blake, 1950

References

Eumolpinae
Chrysomelidae genera
Beetles of North America
Beetles of Central America
Beetles of South America
Taxa named by Wilhelm Ferdinand Erichson